The Joint Council for Qualifications (JCQ) is a community interest company acting as a single voice for the eight largest qualification providers in the United Kingdom offering GCSE, GCE, Scottish Highers and vocationally related qualifications: AQA, CCEA, City & Guilds, Edexcel, NCFE, OCR, SQA and WJEC. The JCQ closely monitors examination administration, invigilation of exams at individual schools and activities of exams officers.

About
The JCQ was established in January 2004 to supersede the Joint Council for General Qualifications (JCGQ, 1998–2003). The JCQ was established to unite to an extent the largest educational and vocational examination boards in the United Kingdom and to administer testing standards. The JCQ should not be confused with Ofqual (Office of Qualifications and Examinations Regulation), the authority to regulate and accredit British examination boards. The JCQ was formed to enable member awarding bodies to act together in:
 providing, wherever possible, common administrative arrangements for the schools and colleges and other providers which offer their qualifications
 dealing with the regulators, in responding to proposals and initiatives on assessment and the curriculum
 dealing with the media on issues affecting all member bodies
 helping the awarding bodies to work together to create common standards, regulations and guidance
 helping them to regulate themselves against those agreed standards as well as monitoring any exceptions
 providing a forum for members to discuss issues, with each other and partner organisations and the regulators
 ensuring examinations are sat under consistent regulations

Regulations and examination practices
The JCQ provides rules and regulations concerning the exams. These are updated annually and published on their website.

British examination boards for GCSEs and GCE A-levels (i.e. AQA, Edexcel, OCR, WJEC, CCEA) are obliged to comply with JCQ's regulations, whereas Cambridge International are not obliged to comply with them for their international GCSEs.

See also
Examination boards in the United Kingdom

References

External links
Official website of JCQ

Education administration in Northern Ireland
Education in the City of Westminster
Education regulators
Educational organisations based in the United Kingdom
Organisations based in the City of Westminster